The list below shows the information on the buildings along Woodward Avenue in Detroit, Michigan. This list begins at Woodward's southern terminus at the Detroit River and proceeds north to the Detroit city limits at Eight Mile Road, also known as M-102.

See also
Detroit Financial District
Lower Woodward Avenue Historic District
Midtown Woodward Historic District
Religious Structures of Woodward Avenue Thematic Resource

References

External links

.
.Woodward
Woodward, Buildings
Detroit, Woodward
Woodward
Woodward Avenue
.Woodward Avenue